Alba Baptista (born 10 July 1997) is a Portuguese actress. She began her career in her native Portugal with the series Jardins Proibidos (2014–2015). She then starred in multiple Portuguese series and films such as A Impostora, Filha da Lei, A Criação, and Jogo Duplo.

From 2020 to 2022, she has starred in the Netflix series Warrior Nun, which marked her English-language debut.

Early life
Baptista was born in Lisbon, Portugal. Her Portuguese mother met her father, a Brazilian engineer from Rio de Janeiro, when she worked as a translator in Brazil. She attended a German school in Portugal. Around age 15, she decided to become an actress. She has cited The Hunchback of Notre Dame (1996) as her favorite movie growing up.

Career 
At age 16, Alba Baptista started her career as the main character in Simão Cayatte's short film Miami. For her performance, she received the Best Actress Award at the Festival Ibérico de Ciné. She furthered her career with appearing in Portuguese series A Criação and the telenovelas A Impostora and Jogo Duplo. During the following years, Alba developed a strong cinema career in Portugal, as well as starring in roles on three popular Portuguese series. Her film work includes: Caminhos Magnétykos by Edgar Pêra, in which she played the role of "Catarina"; and Equinócio by Ivo Ferreira. In 2019 she appeared in the film Patrick, the directorial debut of Gonçalo Waddington, and which was in competition at San Sebastián International Film Festival, where it premiered. She appeared in the 2020 feature film Fatima opposite Harvey Keitel, Sônia Braga, and Joana Ribeiro, which is directed by Marco Pontecorvo.

Her first English-language role came as the lead role of Ava in Netflix's series Warrior Nun, which was released on July 2, 2020. She reprised her role in the second season, which was released on November 10, 2022.

In 2022, she played Natasha, a 1950s Dior muse in Mrs. Harris Goes to Paris.

Filmography

Film

Television

References

External links
 
 Alba Baptista profile at Subtitle Talent
 Alba Baptista profile at Elite Lisbon 

1997 births
Living people
Actresses from Lisbon
Portuguese people of Brazilian descent
Portuguese film actresses
21st-century Portuguese actresses
Actresses of Brazilian descent